It's Your Round is a comedy panel show hosted by Angus Deayton. It airs on BBC Radio 4.

Format
The rules of each round are new every time, as the framework of the rounds is decided by the panellists. Due to the fact that the structure is continuously changing, essentially the format of the show is that it has no format.

Instead, each of the panellists creates and brings their own round to the show for the other panellists to play. Four comedians compete to see who gets to be champion.

For example, in one of the episodes Miles Jupp asked the other panellists to predict whether his dad would know the answers to trivia questions.

Critical response
The Guardian praised Deayton's presentational style, heavy in sardonic wit and mockery, while conceding that some parts of the show were better than others. The Independent was less keen on Deayton but still found the show to be good fun.

Episodes

Series 1

Series 2

.

References

External links

BBC Radio 4 programmes
British panel games
British radio game shows
2010s British game shows